"Nobody's Business" is a song recorded by Barbadian singer Rihanna for her seventh studio album Unapologetic (2012). Co-written by Rihanna together with its producers Terius "The-Dream" Nash and Carlos "Los" McKinney, it features guest vocals by American singer Chris Brown. It is their third collaboration following the domestic violence case that happened between them in 2009. "Nobody's Business" is a house, disco-pop and R&B-funk song that mixes Chicago stepping and features strings, piano, and a four-on-the-floor kick drum. It contains interpolation of the 1987 single "The Way You Make Me Feel" by Michael Jackson.

"Nobody's Business" received generally positive reviews from contemporary music critics with many of them labeling the song as standout on the album. Despite that, some journalists criticized Rihanna's decision to collaborate with Brown again because of their former relationship and domestic violence case. Following the release of Unapologetic, as a result of the strong digital downloads, the song charted on multiple charts worldwide; it peaked at number 36 on the French Singles Chart, number seven on the UK Singles R&B Chart, number 63 on the UK Singles Chart and number 39 on the US Hot R&B/Hip-Hop Songs.

Background and production

On February 8, 2009, Rihanna's scheduled performance at the 51st Grammy Awards was cancelled. Reports later surfaced regarding an altercation with then-boyfriend, singer Chris Brown, who was arrested on suspicion of making criminal threats. On March 5, 2009, Brown was charged with assault and making criminal threats. Over 3 years after the incident, in January 2012, Rihanna was intending to remix the interlude "Birthday Cake" from her 2011 studio album Talk That Talk. On February 15, 2012, Kosine of Da Internz, who produced the interlude, revealed that the featured collaborator will "shock the world," and that the full length version would premiere between February 16, and February 20, 2012. The full length version of "Birthday Cake" revealed to feature Brown and was released on Rihanna's birthday, February 20, 2012." Subsequently, Rihanna lent her vocals to the remix of Brown's 2012 single "Turn Up the Music". Following the leak of the remixes, Rihanna's decision to collaborate with Brown after the 2009 altercation, was largely criticized by media.

In March 2012, Rihanna began "working on the new sound" for her seventh studio album, even though she had not yet begun recording. On September 12, 2012, Def Jam France announced via Twitter that Rihanna would release a new single the upcoming week while her seventh studio album was scheduled to be released in November 2012. On October 11, 2012, in one of her tweets revealed that the title of her new album is Unapologetic along with its cover. On November 6, the singer posted the official track listing of the album, on which there was a song titled "Nobody's Business" that featured Brown. Rihanna co-wrote the song together with its producers Terius "The-Dream" Nash and Carlos "Los" McKinney.  Bart Schoudel recorded the track at the Sarm Studios in London and at the Westlake Recording Studios in Los Angeles. The vocal recording of "Nobody's Business" was done by Kuk Harrell and Marcos Tovar, while Harrel also did the vocal production of the song. Blake Mares and Robert Cohen served as assistant vocal engineers of the track. It was mixed at the Larabee Studios in Los Angeles by Manny Marroquin.

Composition and lyrical interpretation

"Nobody's Business" is a House, disco-pop, pop and R&B-funk song with a length of three minutes and thirty-six seconds. Smokey D. Fontaine of The Urban Daily described it as "a perfect blend of R&B soul and pop feel-good with an irresistible sing-in-the-shower falsetto hook." The track contains interpolation from the composition "The Way You Make Me Feel" (1987) as written and performed by Michael Jackson. Additionally, it has disco-driven influences and "funkified" upbeat tempo. Greg Kot of Chicago Tribune wrote that "Nobody's Business" mixes Chicago stepping and house styles and features strings, piano, and a four-on-the-floor kick drum. Billboard'''s magazine stuff described it as a "wonderfully catchy throwback to early-90s club music", while according to Dan Martin of NME is a swinging summer jam. Writing for The New York Times, Jon Caramanica stated that "Nobody's Business" is gelatinous, smooth, and carefree.

Genevieve Koski of The A.V. Club labeled the duet as "eminently danceable paean to forbidden love". Lyrically, the couple proclaims their eternal fealty, make out in a Lexus and acknowledge the world that the romantic relationship between them is only their business. According to Billboards reviewer, in lines like "you'll always be the one I want to come home to" and "you'll always be my baby", "it makes the beyond-complicated circumstances of their history impossible to ignore." Stacy-Ann Ellis of Vibe magazine, wrote that the song, like the couple’s first post-makeup collaboration, "Birthday Cake (Remix)", is about the history they share and "refuse to let go of—it’ll irk some people". Digital Spy's Robert Copsey noted that vocally Brown does his best to achieve a Jackson impression. Robert Leedham of Drowned in Sound stated that "Nobody's Business" "makes you want to write a long, worthy think piece so you can come to terms with your own moral standing on it."

Critical reception

"Nobody's Business" received generally positive reviews from music critics. Brad Stern of MTV Buzzworthy wrote that although the collaboration itself is controversial, the song is one of the standouts on the album. Copsey of Digital Spy, Ellis of Vibe and Leedham of Drowned in Sound agreed with Stern, with the latter stating, "On an album that’s mildly abrasive and not a lot of fun, its piano-lead stomp and teasing vocal interplay are actually enjoyable." Similarly, Pitchfork Media's Jessica Hooper recognized it as one of the high points on Unapologetic. Caramanica of The New York Times wrote that it is the most tender, affectionate, spirited song on the record, "On an album full of dyspeptic relationships, it is the breath of cool, nourishing air." Jon Reyes of HipHop DX wrote that the song is "a very well thought out move, probably in hopes that it would help soften the impending criticism that Rihanna would receive from singing the pop version of makeup sex with her abusive ex-boyfriend."

Reviewers also noted and praised the interpolation of Jackson's song on the track. Fountaine of The Urban Daily agreed and named is at the album's best track further stating that Jackson's 1989 single "ain’t got nothing on this ['Nobody's Business']". A reviewer of Billboard magazine praised Jackson's influence in the song and stated that is hard to resist to its charm. Koski of The A.V. Club deemed "Nobody's Business" as one of the strongest tracks on the album and compared it to the works from the singer's seventh studio album Bad (1987). The Huffington Post'''s Mesfin Fekadu praised Jackson's song sample on the track, however, dismissed its lyrical content.

Some of the critics were divided on Rihanna's decision to collaborate with Brown again. Toronto Stars Lucas Oleniuk stated that "Nobody's Business" is not a bad track, "it’s one of the catchiest and freshest-sounding here — but the troubling subtext is as irksome as the irony of titling a song that proudly makes the pair’s business everybody's." Bernard Perusse of Montreal Gazette noted that although it is a pretty fair R&B smoker, there is something nauseating and sinister about the song and that is its message. Being more critical towards the collaboration, Randall Roberts of Los Angeles Times wrote that the track represents a sad inversion of the 1965 single "I Got You Babe" by Sonny & Cher, further noting " Instead of singing about connection, true love and wanting to shout it to the world, the song features a convicted abuser and the woman he assaulted asking everyone to shut up and leave them alone."

Credits and personnel
Recording
Music recording – Sarm Studios, London; Westlake Recording Studios Los Angeles, CA
Mixing – Larabee Studios, Los Angeles, CA

Sample
Contains interpolation from the composition "The Way You Make Me Feel" as written and performed by Michael Jackson courtesy of Mijac Music/Sony/ATV Songs LLC (BMI)

Personnel

Songwriting – Terius "The-Dream" Nash, Robyn Fenty, Carlos "Los" McKinney
Production – The-Dream, Carlos "Los" McKinney
Featured artist – Chris Brown
Recording engineers – Bart Schoudel
Vocal recording – Kuk Harrell, Marcos Tovar
Vocal production – Kuk Harrell
Assistant vocal engineering – Blake Mares, Robert Cohen
Mixing – Manny Marroquin

Credits adapted from the liner notes of Unapologetic, Def Jam Recordings, SRP Records.

Charts
Upon the release of Unapologetic, "Nobody's Business" charted in Belgium, France, on two charts in the United Kingdom and in the United States due to strong digital downloads. It debuted and peaked on the French Singles Chart at number 36 for the week dated December 1, 2012, and fluctuated on the chart for over ten weeks. On December 2, 2012, it debuted at number 63 on the UK Singles Chart, and number seven on the UK R&B Chart. "Nobody's Business" appeared and peaked at number 39 on the US Hot R&B/Hip-Hop Songs chart following the release of the album.

References

Rihanna songs
Chris Brown songs
Songs written by Rihanna
Songs written by The-Dream
2012 songs
Songs written by Carlos McKinney
Torch songs
Song recordings produced by The-Dream